Flavius Julius Nepotianus (died 30 June 350), sometimes known in English as Nepotian, was a member of the Constantinian dynasty who reigned as a short-lived usurper of the Roman Empire. He ruled the city of Rome for twenty-eight days, before being killed by his rival usurper Magnentius' general Marcellinus.

Background

Nepotianus was the son of Eutropia, half-sister of Emperor Constantine I, and of Virius Nepotianus. On his mother's side, he was the grandson of Emperor Constantius Chlorus and Flavia Maximiana Theodora.

Events
After the revolt of Magnentius, Nepotianus proclaimed himself emperor and entered Rome with a band of gladiators on 3 June 350. After attempting to resist Nepotianus with an undisciplined force of Roman citizens, the defeated praefectus urbi Titianus (or Anicius, or Anicetus), a supporter of Magnentius, fled the city.

Magnentius quickly dealt with this revolt by sending his trusted magister officiorum Marcellinus to Rome. According to Eutropius, Nepotianus was killed in the resulting struggle (on 30 June), his head put on a lance and borne around the city. In the following days, his mother Eutropia was also killed alongside the supporters of Nepotianus.

See also
 List of Roman Emperors
 List of Roman usurpers

Notes

References

 Aurelius Victor De Caesaribus 42.6, Epitome 42.3
 Zosimus, ii.59

Year of birth missing
350 deaths
4th-century Roman usurpers
Ancient Romans killed in action
Constantinian dynasty
Virii